Northam Traincare Facility, also known as Northam Carriage Servicing Depot, is an electric traction maintenance depot in the suburb of Northam in Southampton, England. The depot is situated on the South West Main Line and is south of St Denys station at Northam Junction. Two tracks on the formation  of the branch to the Eastern Docks are used as the depot headshunt and extra berthing sidings. It is the principal maintenance facility for the Class 444 and 450s operated by South Western Railway.

History 
The depot was opened in 2003 and was the first of Siemens' purpose-built depots in the UK.

Facilities 
The depot consists of three main buildings; the core maintenance facility, a wheel lathe and a train wash.

Present 
As of 2019, stabling is provided for South Western Railway Class 444s and Class 450 Desiros.

References

External links 

Railway depots in England
Rail transport in Hampshire
Buildings and structures in Southampton